was a Japanese semi-professional football team based in Hamada city, Shimane Prefecture. They played in the Chūgoku League, the fourth tier of the Japanese football league system.

Outline
The team was established in April 2001 as FC Central Chūgoku. Though registered to play in Shimane Prefecture, their office and training grounds were originally located in what is now Kitahiroshima, Yamagata district, Hiroshima prefecture. In 2008 the team changed its name to Dezzolla Shimane Esporte Clube, and began to shift its base of operations to Hamada city and the surrounding areas, allowing citizens throughout the prefecture to feel a part of the club. The name is a corrupted portmanteau of the Portuguese words "Deus", meaning "God", and "Olá", meaning "hello". While "Esporte Clube" is Portuguese for "Sport Club". The move was completed in 2012.

As FC Central Chūgoku, home games were mainly played at Hamada City Track and Field Ground and Sun Village Hamada. However, in order to strengthen the idea that it is a club for the whole prefecture, under the name Dezzolla Shimane they also played home matches at Matsue Athletic Stadium (Matsue), Misumi Central Park Track and Field Ground (Hamada), Hamayama Park Track and Field Ground (Izumo and Shimane Prefectural Soccer Park (Masuda). In 2010 Matsue City F.C. (then known as Voladore Matsue) were promoted to the Chūgoku League, after which they, rather than Dezzolla Shimane, used the Matsue Athletic Stadium for home games. For the 2012 season, Dezzolla Shimane's home games are held only at Hamada City Track and Field Ground and Shimane Prefectural Soccer Park.

In 2004, the team made their Emperor's Cup debut at the expense of Iwami F.C. who had represented Shimane Prefecture consecutively from 1997 to 2003. They received a bye to the second round where they beat Shizuoka F.C. on penalties, but were eliminated in the third round due to an 8–0 defeat away to Honda F.C. Similarly, Dezzolla Shimane achieved continuous Emperor's Cup nominations until losing out to Hamada F.C. Cosmos, who are also based in Hamada city, in 2009.

The 2011 season saw the team win its first Chūgoku League title, the first team from Shimane Prefecture to do so. For only the second time, the first being in 2007 when they finished second in the league, they qualified to enter the Regional League promotion series. However, a first round elimination ensured there would be no promotion to the Japan Football League the following season.

From 2012 the management structure at the club had changed, with plans to establish a corporation to run the club announced on the official website, after which the club's head office moved location to Hamada city. It had not been made clear, however, if the club's parent company had or had not also been incorporated. From March 2012, the club also launched an official Twitter account.

Since it was formed, the club had mainly just enlisted various new members, but following the enrollment of such individuals as Takashi Shoji and Kazuaki Hayshi, over the years the team's aspiration also increased. The result being a young team with strong aspirations claiming a 2011 league victory with a desire to continue improving through 2012.

2020 Dissolution of Club announcement (in Japanese) 

Today, the CSL Steering Committee approved it, so I would like to report it.

Due to the effects of the new corona infection, the team was forced to disband as of fiscal 2020, and we submitted a request to leave the Chūgoku League.
I would like to express my great gratitude to the players, staff, sponsors, supporters, Shimane Football Association, and Hamada Branch for their support over the years.
I can't regret the dissolution of working people (type 1 registration) in this way, the withdrawal of CSL, and regret.
We lost the ability to create and operate an environment where we could call on players, and we thought about our worries a lot and came to a decision.
Currently, we are engaged in training activities,
The U-12 team is named "dezzola Shimane E.C" and will continue to work in the future.

We look forward to your continued success.
Thank you very much.

History
 2001 – FC Central Chūgoku established and entered into the Hamada Adult League Division 2. League champions. Promotion to Hamada Adult League Division 1.
 2002 – Hamada Adult League Division 1 champions. Promotion to Shimane Prefectural League Division 2.
 2003 – Shimane Prefectural League Division 2 champions. Promotion to Shimane Prefectural League Division 1.
 2004 – Emperor's Cup debut, eliminated in 3rd round.
 2005 – Shimane Prefectural League Division 1 champions. Chūgoku Soccer League Promotion Tournament champions. Promotion to the Chūgoku League.
 2006 – Chūgoku League runner up.
 2007 – Chūgoku League runner up. Regional League promotion series debut, first round elimination.
 2008 – FC Central Chūgoku becomes Dezzolla Shimane.
 2009 – End of consecutive Emperor's Cup appearances at the hands of Hamada F.C. Cosmos.
 2010 – Chūgoku League runner up.
 2011 – Chūgoku League champions. Regional League promotion series first round elimination.
 2012 – Office moves to Hamada.
 2018 - Relegated from the Chugoku regional league to the Shimane Prefectural League.
 2019 - Champions of Shimane Prefectural League.
 2020 - Did not participate in the Chugoku Soccer League and dissolved as a club.

Name changes
 : 2001 – 2007
 : 2008

Seasons
Up until the end of the 2006 season, when a match ended in a draw a penalty shoot-out would occur. The winning team were awarded 2 points, and the losing team 1 point.

References

External links

Chugoku League The Rising Sun News
 Chūgoku League Official Site 

Football clubs in Japan
Sport in Shimane Prefecture
Association football clubs established in 2001
2001 establishments in Japan
Defunct football clubs in Japan